Miles Golding (born in Sydney in 1951) is a classical violinist, and an original member of Split Enz.  Golding left the band in 1973 (before the recording of the debut album Mental Notes) to pursue further training in London.

Golding has played a variety of London in the Royal Philharmonic Orchestra, BBC Symphony Orchestra, City of London Sinfonia, Academy of St Martin-in-the-Fields, Philomusica, the London Sinfonietta, Kent Opera, and the Orchestra of St John's Smith Square.

After a reunion with Tim Finn, Golding travelled to New Zealand in 2007 and 2008 to play violin on Finn's album The Conversation.

References

1951 births
Living people
New Zealand expatriates in England
Split Enz members
20th-century New Zealand musicians